The Night and the Moment is a 1994 erotic drama film co-written and directed by Anna Maria Tatò and starring Willem Dafoe, Lena Olin and Miranda Richardson. It was screened out of competition at the 51st Venice International Film Festival.

Synopsis
A writer (Dafoe) is invited to the house of a noblewoman (Olin) who adores free-thinkers. He attempts to seduce her but she insists that he tell her of his past love exploits. While doing so, he takes her through his time in prison where he was unknowingly incarcerated in the cell beside hers.

Cast
 Willem Dafoe as the writer
 Lena Olin as the marquise
 Miranda Richardson as Julie
 Jean-Claude Carrière as the governor
 Christine Sireyzol as Justine
 Carole Richert as Armande

References

External links
 
 
 

1994 films
1994 drama films
1990s English-language films
1990s erotic drama films
British erotic drama films
English-language French films
English-language Italian films
Films about writers
Films based on French novels
Films directed by Anna Maria Tatò
Films scored by Ennio Morricone
Films with screenplays by Jean-Claude Carrière
French erotic drama films
Italian erotic drama films
1990s British films
1990s French films